Reginald J. Redding (born September 22, 1968) is a former American football offensive lineman who played two seasons in the National Football League (NFL) with the Atlanta Falcons and New England Patriots. He was drafted by the Falcons in the fifth round of the 1990 NFL Draft. He first enrolled at Laney College before transferring to California State University, Fullerton. Redding attended Forest Park High School in Cincinnati, Ohio.

References

External links
Just Sports Stats

Living people
1968 births
Players of American football from Cincinnati
American football offensive linemen
African-American players of American football
Cal State Fullerton Titans football players
Atlanta Falcons players
New England Patriots players
Laney Eagles football players
21st-century African-American people
20th-century African-American sportspeople